Juan Pablo Suárez Suárez (born May 30, 1985) is a Colombian cyclist, who most recently rode for UCI Continental team . In 2011 he won the Tour do Rio with his team mates finishing in 2nd, 3rd, 4th and 6th places.

Major results

2003
 1st  Time trial, Pan American Junior Road Championships
2009
 1st Stage 1 (TTT) Clásico RCN
2010
 1st Stage 9 Clásico RCN
 2nd Overall Volta Ciclística Internacional de Gravataí
1st Stage 2
 2nd Overall Vuelta a Guatemala
1st Stages 2 & 3
 4th Overall Tour de Santa Catarina
 5th Overall Vuelta a Colombia
 9th Overall Vuelta a Cuba
2011
 1st  Overall Tour do Rio
1st Stage 3
 2nd Vuelta a La Rioja
 5th Gran Premio de Llodio
 6th Overall Vuelta a Castilla y León
 7th Overall Vuelta a Asturias
 10th Overall Vuelta a la Independencia Nacional
2014
 Pan American Road Championships
3rd  Road race
4th Time trial
 3rd Road race, National Road Championships
 7th Overall Tour do Rio
 8th Overall Vuelta a Colombia
1st Stage 1 (TTT)
 10th Overall Vuelta a Guatemala
2015
 Vuelta a Colombia
1st Stages 1 (TTT) & 11
 9th Overall Vuelta a la Independencia Nacional
 10th Overall Tour do Rio
2016
 1st  Team time trial, National Road Championships
 1st Stage 12 Vuelta a Colombia
2017
 1st  Road race, Bolivarian Games
 1st  Overall Clásico RCN
 3rd Overall Vuelta a Colombia
1st Stages 1 (TTT) & 4
2018
 2nd Overall Vuelta a Colombia
1st Stage 5
 3rd  Road race, South American Games
2021
 6th Overall Vuelta a Colombia

References

External links

1985 births
Living people
Colombian male cyclists
South American Games silver medalists for Colombia
South American Games medalists in cycling
Competitors at the 2010 South American Games
Competitors at the 2018 South American Games
Sportspeople from Medellín
21st-century Colombian people